Sir Henry Heydon (died 1504) was the son of John Heydon of Baconsthorpe, Norfolk, 'the well-known opponent of the Paston family'. He married Anne Boleyn, the daughter of Sir Geoffrey Boleyn, great-grandfather of Henry VIII's queen Anne Boleyn.

Career

Henry Heydon was the son of John Heydon (d.1479) of Baconsthorpe, Norfolk, and Eleanor Winter, the daughter of Edmund Winter (d.1448) of Barningham, Norfolk. Trained as a lawyer, he frequently advised other Norfolk landowners and acted for them as a feoffee and arbitrator. He served as a Justice of the Peace in Norfolk from 1473, and on various commissions in that county and elsewhere.

His inheritance from his father included at least sixteen manors, and he added to his holdings through the purchase of lands in both Norfolk and Kent. One of his purchases in Kent was West Wickham, where he built Wickham Court, and after establishing himself as a Kent landowner he served as Justice of the Peace there in the late 1480s and in the 1490s. Henry Stafford, 2nd Duke of Buckingham, was a trustee for his land purchases in Kent, and Heydon subsequently acted as steward in Norfolk to Buckingham's widow, Catherine Woodville, Duchess of Buckingham, in the 1490s. He was a supervisor of the will of Cecily Neville, Duchess of York, and served as her steward of household and chief bailiff of the Honour of Eye.

Although he was knighted at the coronation of Henry VII, and was among those present at the reception of Catherine of Aragon when she arrived in England in 1501, he was 'primarily a local servant of the crown rather than a courtier'.

Some of the wealth he accumulated as a sheep farmer was expended in building projects. In Norfolk he completed the castle begun by his father at Baconsthorpe, restored the parish church at Kelling and built a new church at Salthouse, and constructed a causeway between Thursford and Walsingham. In Kent he rebuilt the church at West Wickham, and built a fortified manor house there.

He died at Baconsthorpe between 20 February and 22 May 1504, and was buried beside his father in the Heydon family chapel which then existed at Norwich Cathedral. A memorial window, said to be his, in the church at West Wickham depicts a kneeling human skeleton, with the Heydon arms.

Marriage and issue
He married, likely after 1463, Anne Boleyn, second daughter of Sir Geoffrey Boleyn, Lord Mayor of London, by whom he had three sons and five daughters:

John Heydon, eldest son and heir, a leading member of the Norfolk gentry during the reign of Henry VIII, who married Katherine Willoughby, the daughter of Sir Christopher Willoughby of Parham, Suffolk, and Margaret Jenny. Their daughter Eleanor Heydon was the grandmother of Sir Roger Townshend.
Henry Heydon, esquire, who married Anne, the daughter of John Armstrong.
William Heydon, slain during Kett's Rebellion, and buried in the church of St Peter Mancroft, Norwich.
Dorothy Heydon, who married, as his first wife, Thomas Brooke, 8th Baron Cobham (d.1529), by whom she had seven sons, including John, George Brooke, 9th Baron Cobham, Thomas, William and Edward, and six daughters, including Margaret, who married Sir John Fogge (d.1564); Faith, who married William Ockenden; and Elizabeth (d.1560), who married firstly the poet Sir Thomas Wyatt (d. 10 October 1542), and secondly Sir Edward Warner.
Bridget Heydon, who married Sir William Paston (c.1479 – 1554), son of Sir John Paston and his first wife, Margery Brewes. Bridget was the mother four future MPs (Erasmus, John, Sir Thomas and Clement Paston (d. 1598)) and of Eleanor Paston, Countess of Rutland and grandmother of Bridget Chaworth.
Anne Heydon (died c.1521), who married firstly William Gurney of Instead, Norfolk, and secondly Sir Lionel Dymoke (d. 17 August 1519) of Ashby, Lincolnshire.
Elizabeth Heydon, who married Sir Walter Hobart, esquire, of Hales Hall.
Amy Heydon, who married Sir Roger L'Estrange of Hunstanton, Norfolk.

Notes

References

External links
Baconsthorpe Retrieved 3 October 2013
The Heydons of Baconsthorpe Who Built Salthouse Church Retrieved 3 October 2013

1504 deaths
15th-century English people
16th-century English people
Year of birth unknown
People from Baconsthorpe